Patrick J. Horan (dates of birth and death unknown) was a Major League Baseball pitcher and outfielder during part of the 1884 season. Horan made 13 appearances as a pitcher (10 starts) and 10 as an outfielder in a total of 20 games for the Chicago Browns of the Union Association.  He was a below-average fielder at both positions.

He completed 9 of his 10 starts, and finished seventh in the league with 3 games finished.  He won 3, lost 6, and had an ERA of 3.49 in 98 innings pitched.  All three of his victories came on the road against the Kansas City Cowboys. As a hitter, he was 6-for-68 for a batting average of .088.  He drew one walk to push his on-base percentage to .101, and scored 3 runs.

External links

Retrosheet

Chicago Browns/Pittsburgh Stogies players
Major League Baseball pitchers
Major League Baseball outfielders
19th-century baseball players